This is a list of named geological features on Dione, a moon of Saturn. Dionean geological features are named after people and places in Roman mythology.

Catenae
Catenae are crater chains. They are named after rivers in Roman mythology.

Chasmata
Dionean chasms or canyons are called chasmata . They are named after important locations in Roman mythology and history.

Dorsa
Dionean ridges are called dorsa.  They are named after Roman hills.

Fossae

Dionean fossae  (long narrow depressions) are named after cities, streets and rivers in Roman mythology.

Lineae

Originally, three geological features were labelled lineae (bright wispy markings). However, later evidence from the Cassini probe revealed them to be icy chasms, and they were all renamed as such (see above).

Craters

Dionean craters are named after figures from Greek and Roman mythology, especially Virgil's The Aeneid.

See also
List of quadrangles on Dione

External links

 USGS: Dione nomenclature

Dione (moon)
Dione (moon)
Dione